"Jumped Right In" is a song recorded by Canadian country rock artist Dallas Smith. It was released in August 2012 as the third single from his debut solo album, Jumped Right In. It peaked at number 69 on the Canadian Hot 100 in December 2012.

"Jumped Right In" was nominated for Single of the Year at the 2013 Canadian Country Music Association Awards. The song became Smith's first single to receive a Gold certification from Music Canada in November 2013.

Music video
The music video was directed by Stephano Barberis and premiered in August 2012.

Chart performance
"Jumped Right In" debuted at number 86 on the Canadian Hot 100 for the week of September 15, 2012.

Certifications

References

2012 songs
2012 singles
Dallas Smith songs
604 Records singles
Songs written by Chris Tompkins
Music videos directed by Stephano Barberis
Song recordings produced by Joey Moi
Songs written by Felix McTeigue
Songs about nostalgia